In six-dimensional geometry, a steric 6-cube is a convex uniform 6-polytope. There are unique 4 steric forms of the 6-cube.

Steric 6-cube

Alternate names 
 Runcinated demihexeract/6-demicube
 Small prismated hemihexeract (Acronym sophax) (Jonathan Bowers)

Cartesian coordinates 
The Cartesian coordinates for the 480 vertices of a steric 6-cube centered at the origin are coordinate permutations:
 (±1,±1,±1,±1,±1,±3)
with an odd number of plus signs.

Images

Related polytopes

Stericantic 6-cube

Alternate names 
 Runcitruncated demihexeract/6-demicube
 Prismatotruncated hemihexeract (Acronym pithax) (Jonathan Bowers)

Cartesian coordinates 
The Cartesian coordinates for the 2880 vertices of a stericantic 6-cube centered at the origin are coordinate permutations:
 (±1,±1,±1,±3,±3,±5)
with an odd number of plus signs.

Images

Steriruncic 6-cube

Alternate names 
 Runcicantellated demihexeract/6-demicube
 Prismatorhombated hemihexeract (Acronym prohax) (Jonathan Bowers)

Cartesian coordinates 
The Cartesian coordinates for the 1920 vertices of a steriruncic 6-cube centered at the origin are coordinate permutations:
 (±1,±1,±1,±1,±3,±5)
with an odd number of plus signs.

Images

Steriruncicantic 6-cube

Alternate names 
 Runcicantitruncated demihexeract/6-demicube
 Great prismated hemihexeract (Acronym gophax) (Jonathan Bowers)

Cartesian coordinates 
The Cartesian coordinates for the 5760 vertices of a steriruncicantic 6-cube centered at the origin are coordinate permutations:
 (±1,±1,±1,±3,±5,±7)
with an odd number of plus signs.

Images

Related polytopes 

There are 47 uniform polytopes with D6 symmetry, 31 are shared by the B6 symmetry, and 16 are unique:

Notes

References 
 H.S.M. Coxeter: 
 H.S.M. Coxeter, Regular Polytopes, 3rd Edition, Dover New York, 1973 
 Kaleidoscopes: Selected Writings of H.S.M. Coxeter, edited by F. Arthur Sherk, Peter McMullen, Anthony C. Thompson, Asia Ivic Weiss, Wiley-Interscience Publication, 1995,  
 (Paper 22) H.S.M. Coxeter, Regular and Semi Regular Polytopes I, [Math. Zeit. 46 (1940) 380-407, MR 2,10]
 (Paper 23) H.S.M. Coxeter, Regular and Semi-Regular Polytopes II, [Math. Zeit. 188 (1985) 559-591]
 (Paper 24) H.S.M. Coxeter, Regular and Semi-Regular Polytopes III, [Math. Zeit. 200 (1988) 3-45]
 Norman Johnson Uniform Polytopes, Manuscript (1991)
 N.W. Johnson: The Theory of Uniform Polytopes and Honeycombs, Ph.D. 
  x3o3o *b3o3x3o - sophax, x3x3o *b3o3x3o - pithax, x3o3o *b3x3x3o - prohax, x3x3o *b3x3x3o - gophax

External links 
 
 Polytopes of Various Dimensions
 Multi-dimensional Glossary

6-polytopes